Words and Music is a 1929 American pre-Code musical comedy film directed by James Tinling and starring Lois Moran, Helen Twelvetrees, and Frank Albertson. It was written by Andrew Bennison, story by Frederick Hazlitt Brennan and Jack Edwards.

Released by Fox Film Corporation, the film is notable as the first in which John Wayne is credited as "Duke Morrison". Wayne was also credited as "Duke Morrison" as a property assistant in the Art Department. Ward Bond, Wayne's lifelong good friend, also had a bit part in the movie.

Plot
Two young college students, Phil and Pete, compete for the love of a pretty girl named Mary, and also to win the $1500 prize in a song-writing contest to write the best show tune for the annual college revue. The two men each ask Mary to sing for them, but eventually, she chooses Phil as her beau, and it is he who also has the winning song.

Although the film was largely devoid of much plot line, as was typical of musical revue pictures of the period, there is a great deal of singing and dancing. Many of Lois Moran's numbers were actually footage that was cut from the film Fox Movietone Follies of 1929, which were edited out when the film was found to be too long. This film was created to make use of the deleted scenes, and so was fashioned around Moran's singing talent. Songs include: "Too Wonderful for Words" (William Kernell, Dave Stamper, Paul Gerard Smith, Edmund Joseph), "Stepping Along" (Kernell), "Shadows" (Con Conrad, Sidney D. Mitchell, Archie Gottler).

Cast
Lois Moran as Mary Brown
David Percy as Phil
Helen Twelvetrees as Dorothy Blake
William Orlamond as Pop Evans
Elizabeth Patterson as Dean Crockett
John Wayne (credited as Duke Morrison) as Pete Donahue 
Frank Albertson as Skeet Mulroy
Tom Patricola as Hannibal

See also
 John Wayne filmography

External links

Words and Music details, tvguide.com
Film review, The New York Times 

1929 films
1929 musical comedy films
1929 romantic comedy films
American musical comedy films
American romantic comedy films
American romantic musical films
American black-and-white films
1920s English-language films
Lost American films
Fox Film films
1920s romantic musical films
1929 lost films
Films directed by James Tinling
1920s American films
Silent romantic comedy films